Trenton Township is a township in Grundy County, in the U.S. state of Missouri.

Trenton Township was established in 1872, and named after the community of the same name within its borders.

References

Townships in Missouri
Townships in Grundy County, Missouri